"It Must Be Him" is a popular song with music written by Gilbert Bécaud, originally with French lyrics by Maurice Vidalin and recorded by Bécaud as "Seul Sur Son Étoile". The English version recorded by Vikki Carr was a hit around the world, reaching No. 3 in the United States, No. 2 in the UK, and No. 1 in Australia.

Vikki Carr version

New English lyrics (and a new English title) were written by Mack David. The song was published in 1967. The best-selling version of the song was recorded that year by Vikki Carr, which reached number three on the U.S. pop chart and spent three weeks at number one on the easy listening chart. The single peaked at number two in the United Kingdom, spent three weeks at number one in Australia and went to number thirteen in Ireland. Carr went on to record it in Spanish and Italian, as well. The original English recording of the song was featured in the 1987 Norman Jewison film Moonstruck.

Charts

See also
List of number-one adult contemporary singles of 1967 (U.S.)

References

External links
Vikki Carr official website

1967 songs
Vikki Carr songs
Shirley Bassey songs
Songs about telephone calls
Songs with music by Gilbert Bécaud
Songs with lyrics by Mack David
1967 singles
Liberty Records singles